Jean de Tinan, a.k.a. Jean Le Barbier de Tinan, (1874–1898) was a French writer.

Biography
Born to a baron and a socialite, Jean de Tinan moved to Paris in 1895 after graduating from the School of Agriculture in Montpellier.
He is remembered as a figure of the Belle Époque.

Bibliography
 Un document sur l'impuissance d'aimer (1894)
 Penses-tu réussir !  (1897)
 Maîtresse d'esthètes  (1897)
 L'Example de Ninon de Lenclos amoureuse (1898)
 Un villain monsieur (1898)
 Aimienne ou le détournement de mineure (1899)

Film adaptations
In 2002, a film was made on his novel Le Doux amour des hommes.

Literary significance and criticism
Stéphane Mallarmé referred to his Penses-tu réussir! as a modern version of Gustave Flaubert's Sentimental Education.

References

1874 births
1898 deaths
19th-century French writers
19th-century French male writers
Belle Époque